Swiftsure was first of eight or more similar locomotives with a single pair of driving wheels built by George Forrester and Company (Forresters) from 1834.  The tank variant was the first passenger tank engine to enter service in the world.

They have been claimed to be the first locomotives to use outside horizontal cylinders and also the first to use 4 eccentric cranks.

Locomotives were supplied to the Liverpool and Manchester Railway (L&MR), Dublin and Kingstown (D&KR), London and Greenwich (L&GR), Birmingham and Gloucester (B&GR), and a few other minor railways.

History
George Forrester's Vauxhall Foundry had been established in Liverpool by 1827, taking over a disused cotton mill. The L&MR had started operating in 1830, becoming the first example of successfully operating railway in the world and the model upon which the next generation of railways used as a study example for their own projects. While most L&MR locomotives in the early 1830s were supplied by Robert Stephenson and Company of Newcastle that company was unable to supply demand and other suppliers were entering the market. Forrester's had first become with the proposal to construct locomotives in response to a tender invitation by the L&MR in May 1831 but pulled out following a misunderstanding with the L&MR's secretary Henry Booth, the tender being satisfied by Bee and Liver from Edward Bury and Experiment from Robert Sharp. Forresters, along with other firms, did however perform some locomotive component construction or repair work for the L&MR in the early 1830s.

Origins
The D&KR had started their procurement for tendering for locomotives in August 1833 approaching nine firms with a requirement for six locomotives to be delivered in perfect working order by 1 May 1834; the seven who replied all commenting on the short timescale.  The D&KR engaged John Urpeth Rastrick as consultant to visit the prospective builders and he returned with a specification which matched an improved Experiment locomotive from Sharp Brothers of Manchester.  D&KR engineers Vignoles and Bergin has concerns over the vertical cylinders and other aspects of 'Experiment and Sharp Brothers design and the D&KR board of directors asked the locomotive manufacturers to submit their own proposals; Liverpools's Edward Bury, favoured by some of the D&KR's Quaker board, being eliminated at his stage over insistence of use of an inside-cylinder design with a crank axle which was not favoured by D&KR engineers.

In December 1833, with time running short to get locomotives built for their planned start of operations the D&KR board finally placed based an order for three locomotives from Sharp Brothers that were to become the Hibernia type, and three from George Forrester.  They would have originally preferred to have placed all six with one manufacturer for parts commonality however ability to complete the build in the needed timescale had become a priority and degrees of uncertainty about both designs may have been a factor. Forrester had not built any locomotive prior to the D&KR order, so winning the order may seem unexpected.  Forrester did have some advantages: Liverpool base at convenient to the L&MR and their workshops; Good communications with regular steam packet to Dublin; previous component build work for the L&MR; amiable relations with the customer; and a reputation for good workmanship, though that may have gained later.  The design may have been evolved with the collaboration of or intention to satisfy Vignoles and Bergin.  Snell claims Vignoles obtained a set of drawings from Dodds, albeit Snell also claims Dodds influence was not present until later D&KR engines.  While seemingly not involved in the design the employment of Alexander Allan from Stephenson's would have been a help.  It is also the case Forrester was given the Stephenson locomotive Milo by the L&MR in 1834 with a view to a repair quote; the L&MR eventually accepting Milo was uneconomic to repair leaving Forrester to scrap Milo and with the L&MR proving Swiftsure as a replacement early in 1834 — the precise dates are unclear and it was possibly too late in the year to reverse engineer any of Milos features into the Forrester design.

D&KR officials often did spot visits to Forresters during their locomotives' construction and were generally well received by Forresters, their spot checks at Sharps sometimes gave indication of staff problems and absenteeism.

The company first began to produce railway locomotives in 1834.  The locomotives constructed in that year were Swiftsure for the L&MR; with Vauxhall, Dublin and Kingstown for the D&KR which was to begin operations in December of that year.  Swiftsure was a locomotive built by Forresters of the Vauxhall Foundry in Liverpool which entered service for the L&MR in 1834 as No. 36.

Stretton claims Swiftsure to be the first locomotive built by the company, though others have stated that this might not be the case. However information from Mr Alexander Allan (engineer at Forresters) published in 1883 pointed to an error in a publication in The Engineer in 1881 where the Swiftsure was listed at built in 1835. He pointed out that Swiftsure was the first locomotive, being built 'early in 1834', and he attended it on trials, etc; he also went to Dublin late in 1834 with the three locomotives for the Dublin and Kingstown Railway ('of the same size and design as the Swiftsure'), and was responsible for their care while under the Forrester's maintenance contract. The confusion may have arisen because Swiftsure worked from the Liverpool end of the L&MR in 1834, before being transferred to the Manchester end of the line in 1835. Swiftsure had a pair of trailing wheels added in 1836, and was in regular service until 1842.

Design
The type were the first locomotives to use outside cylinders and also the first outside and inside frames, though the later was not appreciated at the time and only adopted some ten years later. The combination of outside frames on a short  wheelbase with unbalanced driving wheels led to an oscillating motion and led to the nickname of "Boxers".

Liverpool and Manchester
It was noted as being involved in a collision with at Parkside on 11 November 1934 with the consequence that a labourer was crushed between wagons of the stationary between the wagons of the stationary luggage train. Swiftsure was involved in a further incident in July 1835 whilst descending the incline at Whiston, Merseyside when a train of five silk wagons caught fire; the train took several hundred yards to stop and some wagons were only detached with difficulty. The L&MR was ultimately advised to pay £3,000 damages for the high value load on the basis they had not adequately displayed notices that the owners should have insured it. Swiftsure was involved in several experiments during its service life. In November 1836 the L&MR performed a coal burning trial involving Swiftsure and several other locomotives, the results being generally unsuccessful with Swiftsures firebox damaged by excessive heat. Locomotives at this period were forced to use the more expensive and sometimes problematic coke in order to fulfill the requirement to "consume their own smoke"; it took several years for the technology to use coal successfully in locomotives to evolve.

Dublin and Kingstown
The Forresters' locomotives for the D&KR became known as Vauxhall, Dublin and Kingstown; the names being those of the manufacturing foundry and the termini of the line.

The first of the D&KR locomotives ran sufficiently well on tests on the L&MR that it was permitted by their superintendent Manchester to take charge of the first class train to Liverpool on 27 June 1834. The journey was completed in 1 hour 17 minutes with several D&KR people on board including James Pim, Thomas Flemming Bergin, Vignoles and other directors.

Vauxhall along with Hibernia were transported to Dublin on the same sailing before being hauled through the streets on temporary tracks.  Murray says there is a legend Vauxhall was the first locomotive to reach the D&KR's tracks, making it Ireland's first steam locomotive.

The first recorded service of the invited members of the public being transported was a special preview trip to Martello Tower and Booterstown by Vauxhall on 4 October 1834. The honour of the first trial run over the entire length of the line fell to Forresters Hibernia on 9 October 1834 with Vauxhall doing a trip later in the day.

The honour of the first scheduled train in Ireland fell to Sharp's locomotive Hibernia at 09:00 17 December 1834; this being the famously celebrated inaugural run. While Forrester's Vauxhall ran the next service and both continued running trips throughout the day. The D&KR commenced its full scheduled service in January 1835.

Maintenance of the class was at the Serpentine Road "engine hospital" with one section reserved for Forrester locomotives with their man Alexander Allan on site for one year per the purchase contract.

The D&KR began requesting quotes for two more engines in February 1835; Vignoles' earlier suggestion eight locomotives would be required proving more accurate in practice than consuktant Rastrick's suggest only four would be necessary.  On 28 March 1835 the motive power situation became desperate when Forrester locomotive's Vauxhall and Dublin were in collision, with requests to England for spare tenders. Murray claims the D&KR had begun to consider tank engines carry their own coke and water had begun to be considered from February due to the operational inconvenience of having to separate the locomotive and tender so each could be turned independently on the D&KR's  turntables, the latter at least being manually pushed.  The order for two  locomotives's was put in Forrester's, in the event these were named Comet and Victoria, with Murray claiming these were "the first tank engines to work on any public railway".
 
All five Forrester D&KR singles were converted to six wheel tank engines by 1841, the conversion being relatively simple with the fitting of water tanks under the boiler and extending the footplate to incorporate a coke stage and the addition of a trailing axle.

London and Greenwich
Locomotives in use at this point were two Planet type of the  configuration. Royal William was supplied by William Marshall & Sons. Lowe also finds alternative sources indicating No. 1 was supplied by Charles Tayleur and Company which had links to Stephenson and this was as a set of parts and assembled on site. That source also indicates Marshalls were previously Braithwaites until 1839,  and Venus supplied by the L&MR possibly as a hire to replace an esoteric  rotary steam engine supplied by Earl Dundonald. Victoria from Forresters became the third operational engine in May 1836 for the sum of £1,010 10s 0d. The L&GR had initially ordered locomotives from Stephenson's and Burys however neither actually supplied. Forrester's second engine Walter arrived in December 1836 in time for the extension to London Bridge station, becoming the sixth operational engine, Royal William having acquired three sister locomotives in the interim. Victoria and Walter with their  configuration and acquired the nickname "Boxers" for the typical yawing motion of type. Trials in 1837 revealed that Walter was more powerful than Royal William. Both were converted to tender locomotives, possibly in an effort to reduce the yawing. They were painted green, acquiring the numbers five and six respectively and possibly losing their names from the 1840s.

Walter was never fitted with a trailing axle. It saw service at Redhill repair shops from January 1846 followed by an assignment to the Gomshall sandpits from 1853 until it was scrapped along with Victoria.

Birmingham and Gloucester
The Birmingham and Gloucester Railway possessed four Forrester s: the Cheltenham, the Worcester, the Bromsgrove and the Tewkesbury.  They had been ordered by Edward Bury soon after his appointment as locomotive advisor and agent and two arrived in November 1838 and were used on construction. They proved more reliable than the American Norris engines and were allocated to the important mail services.  With their  wheel arrangement they were totally unsuited and never intended for climbing the steep Lickey Incline and for this ascent they were assisted by the Norris Type A Extra bank engines.

Other railways
Parliamentary papers published in 1842 seem to yield examples of other railways using  and  Forrester engines.  The Preston and Wyre Railway (P&WR) had a Forrester  it sued for light goods, ballasting work, and occasional special passenger trains.  Its other engine was a  goods and its passenger services were generally worked by another railway.  The P&WR was aware their six-wheeled locomotive seemed to cause far less track wear than several other four wheel locomotives used on the railway, but that there 4 wheel Forrester could negotiate some curves the six wheel could not.  The Grand Junction Railway had between one and three Forrester engines  engines based on the information they had three locomotives with outside cylinders with one different from the other two.  The Manchester, Bolton & Bury Canal Navigation and Railway (MB&CNR) had two Forrester s and eight s from Edward Bury and William Fairbairn with a preference to go for Bury's engine if more were needed.

Legacy
The class was to form the basis for later locomotives built by the D&KR for itself starting with the Princess in 1939. The locomotives Alexander Allan went on design for the Grand Junction Railway and London and North Western Railway (including the Crewe type (locomotive)) showed influences from Forrester practice.

Notes

References

Footnotes

Sources
 
 

 
 
 
 
 
 
 
 
 
 
 

 
 
 

2-2-0 locomotives
Railway locomotives introduced in 1834
Steam locomotives of Ireland
Standard gauge locomotives of Ireland
5 ft 3 in gauge locomotives
Scrapped locomotives